Pumenengo is a comune (municipality) in the Province of Bergamo in the Italian region of Lombardy, located about  east of Milan and about  southeast of Bergamo.

Pumenengo borders the following municipalities: Calcio, Fontanella, Roccafranca, Rudiano, Torre Pallavicina.

References